Pacesetter may refer to:

Pacesetter (fishing vessel), capsized January 27, 1996
Pacesetter Ltd, a defunct company that published role-playing and board games
Pacesetter Park in Sylvania, Ohio, United States
Pacesetter Propeller Works, a manufacturer of aircraft propellers
Pacemaker (running), a runner used to help establish fast racing times
Pacesetter Systems, a defunct biotechnology company
Pacesetter Novels, a series by African writers started in 1977